The 1973 Cotton Bowl Classic, part of the 1972 bowl game season, took place on January 1, 1973, at the Cotton Bowl in Dallas, Texas. The competing teams were the Alabama Crimson Tide, representing the Southeastern Conference (SEC), and the Texas Longhorns, representing the Southwest Conference (SWC). Texas won the game by a final score of 17–13.

Teams

Alabama

The 1972 Alabama squad finished the regular season with a 10–1 record and as conference champions. Their only loss came against Auburn in the Iron Bowl by a final score of 17–16 in the famous Punt Bama Punt game. The appearance marked the fourth for Alabama in the Cotton Bowl, their 26th overall bowl game appearance.

Texas

The 1972 Texas squad finished the regular season with a 9–1 record. Their only loss came against Oklahoma in the Red River Rivalry by a final score of 27–0. Following their victory over TCU, university officials announced they accepted an invitation to play in the Cotton Bowl. The appearance marked the fourteenth for Texas in the Cotton Bowl, their 20th overall bowl game appearance and their fifth straight Cotton Bowl appearance after winning their fifth straight Southwest Conference championship by going undefeated in conference play.

Game summary
Alabama opened the game by going up 10–0 as a result of a pair of Alan Lowry interceptions. Steve Wade made both interceptions for the Crimson Tide, and the first resulted in a 50-yard Greg Gantt field goal and the second a 31-yard Wilbur Jackson touchdown. After trading field goals in the second quarter, Alabama took a 13–3 lead at the half. In the second half, the Texas defense shutout the Alabama offense, and a pair of rushing touchdowns from Longhorn quarterback Alan Lowry from three and 34-yards sealed the 17–13 Texas victory.

References

Cotton
1973
Alabama Crimson Tide football bowl games
Texas Longhorns football bowl games
January 1973 sports events in the United States
Cotton Bowl